Second 20s is a 2015 South Korean television series starring Choi Ji-woo, Lee Sang-yoon, Choi Won-young, Son Na-eun and Kim Min-jae. It aired on tvN from August 28 to October 17, 2015, on Fridays and Saturdays at 20:30 (KST) for 16 episodes.

Synopsis
Ha No-ra once dreamed of becoming a dancer, but she unexpectedly became pregnant at age 19 and had to quit school and get married. For the next two decades, her life revolved around being a housewife and mother. Now 38 years old and on the brink of divorce, No-ra is diagnosed with terminal pancreatic cancer and given a six-month prognosis. So she decides to go back to school and experience college life for the first time. Among the incoming freshmen are her own 20-year-old son Kim Min-soo and his girlfriend Oh Hye-mi, who are horrified to have No-ra as their classmate. Unbeknownst to No-ra, her intellectual snob husband Kim Woo-chul recently accepted a job teaching psychology at the same university, and her prickly theater arts professor turns out to be Cha Hyun-seok, who had a crush on No-ra in high school.

Cast
Choi Ji-woo as Ha No-ra 
Ha Seung-ri as young No-ra
Lee Sang-yoon as Cha Hyun-seok
Kim Hee-chan as young Hyun-seok
Choi Won-young as Kim Woo-chul 
Kang Tae-oh as young Woo-chul
Son Na-eun as Oh Hye-mi
Kim Min-jae as Kim Min-soo
Han Sung-yun as Hyun-Jung
Jung Soo-young as Ra Yoon-young
Im Ji-hyun as young Yoon-young
Noh Young-hak as Na Soon-nam
Woo Ki-hoon as Woo-hun
Choi Yoon-so as Shin Sang-ye
Ji Ha-yoon as Min-ae	
Jin Ki-joo as Park Seung-hyun
Kim Kang-hyun as Seo Dong-chul
Ban Hyo-jung as Seo Woon-hae, No-ra's grandmother (cameo)

Original soundtrack

Part 1

Part 2

Part 3

Part 4

Part 5

Part 6

Part 7

Ratings
In this table,  represent the lowest ratings and  represent the highest ratings.

Awards and nominations

References

External links
  
 
 

TVN (South Korean TV channel) television dramas
2015 South Korean television series debuts
2015 South Korean television series endings
2010s college television series
South Korean romantic comedy television series
Television series by AStory
Television series by JS Pictures
South Korean college television series